Roberto Tucker (born June 27, 1983 in Olavarría) is an Argentine footballer who currently plays for Racing de Olavarría.

Tucker began his career playing for amateur side El Fortín de Olavarría in 2001. In 2004, he joined semi-professional side Racing Club de Olavarría of the regionalised 4th division. The club were promoted to the regionalised 3rd division in 2005 but descended again the following season.

In 2008, he turned fully pro, joining Quilmes of the 2nd division. In 2009, he joined Portuguese side Leixões S.C.

External links
Statistics at BDFA 

1983 births
Living people
Sportspeople from Buenos Aires Province
Argentine footballers
Association football defenders
Argentine expatriate footballers
Quilmes Atlético Club footballers
Leixões S.C. players
Deportivo Merlo footballers
Primeira Liga players
Expatriate footballers in Portugal